Gallium is a chemical element with symbol Ga and atomic number 31.

Gallium may also refer to:

 Gallium experiment, a neutrino detection experiment also known as GALLEX
 Gallium scan or gallium imaging, a method for the detection of infections and cancers
 Gallium3D, a software library for 3D graphics acceleration
 GalliumOS, a Linux distribution optimized for Chromebooks

See also

 Galium, a genus of plants
 Ga (disambiguation)
 Isotopes of gallium